In Argentina, road signs are similar to those of other South American countries. They are something of a compromise between the Vienna Convention signs used in Europe and the U.S. system. Argentina is right-hand traffic.

While warning signs are mostly based on the US's MUTCD (yellow diamond shape), information, mandatory and prohibitory signs were taken from the Vienna Convention diagrams.

In 1994, the Congress of Argentina promulgated Law n° 24.449 with the purpose of establishing a single rules system within the whole country. The diagrams of those road signs were published in the "Anex L" of Decree 779 (promulgated in 1995), which ruled Law 24.449 and added visual information to its article 22.

Starting in 2013, the National Directorate of Roads of Argentina (DNV) published a series of visual identity guides that detailed specific norms for the installation and use of road signs along the country, including fonts, colors, materials, and measures, among other items. Those manuals also included an update (released in 2017) to some road signs.

History 
The first road signs in Argentina can be traced to 1817 in Buenos Aires Province, when Juan Martín de Pueyrredón (then Supreme Director of the United Provinces of the Río de la Plata) promulgated a Decree to create a Road Committee. This committee was commissioned to place posts on the main roads to serve as reference and guide for pedestrians. Those posts indicated leagues travelled and destinations.

In 1855, another provincial decree provided for new signs consisting of kilometre markers, which also indicated the name (or number) of the road. Both decree established the basements of an organised sign system not only in Buenos Aires but in the whole country. In 1885, engineer Jorge Coquet designed a sign system which is considered the first organised system in the country. The system was a complete program that include measurements,  heights, types of plaques, among other specifications. Those signs were popularly known as "Coquet signs".

After that, the Argentine Automobile Club ("Automóvil Club Argentino"), the largest automobile association of Argentina, started to design an own system of signs (made of iron) and placing them on the main roads in the country.

In 1932, the "Dirección Nacional de Vialidad" (the Argentine national office in charge of the development, planning and conservation of national routes, abbreviated DNV) was created through law 11,658. It established that all the provinces of Argentina should adopt a unique sign system (similar to the US road signs). Nevertheless, in May 1935 the Congress of Argentina promulgated Law 12,153 which ruled that Argentina subscribed to road signs approved by the 1926 International Convention relating to Road Traffic held in Paris. In article 9, Law specified that road signs should be equilateral triangle-shaped, following the procedures of the Paris convention but unlike signs used in Argentina (in form of diamond).

To reach a consensus and solve the problem, in 1939 the DNV created a committee to make variations to the existing sign system. After studying the case, the committee established a code that incorporated both systems, Paris convention's and US signs. It finally came into force in December 1939 and has remained (with minor variations) since then.

The DNV published its first manual of road signs in 1928 (under the name "Señales Camineras") with later editions in 1954, 1963, 1971 and 2017. The FHWA Series typeface was adopted as the main font by the DNV in 1971.

In 1941, the DVBA ("Dirección de Vialidad de Buenos Aires", the provincial road administration) signed the first agreement with the Argentine Automobile Club (ACA), which stated that the ACA would built and place about 5,000 road signs on the main routes of Buenos Aires. Other agreements were later signed between both institutions, in 1955 and 1959, that added 6,000 signs to the routes. The total amount for the 11,000 signs was m$n 2,352,000. The ACA also signed agreements with other provincial administrations, such as San Juan (in 1942), Santa Fe (1945), Entre Ríos (1945), and San Luis (1947).

The Buenos Aires Visual Plan established in 1971 in the city of Buenos Aires introduced minor variations on some existing warning and regulatory signs, a part of redesigning street name signs completely. Those signs also introduced the use of the helvetica font in the urban signal system of Buenos Aires. That same year the ACA signed new agreements with the DNV, DVBA and other provincial offices (Santa Fe, Formosa) to built and place road signs. The total of signs were 20,000 for the DNV and 15,000 for the DVBA.

Argentine road signs were introduced in December 1994, with the promulgation of Law 24.449 by the Congress of Argentina, with the purpose of establishing a single rules system within the whole country. Annex "L"  of art. 22 ("uniform sign system") included a list of updated road signs for all the Argentine territory.

Signs system

Regulatory signs

Warning signs

Informative signs

Retired signs (1994-2017)

Other retired signs

See also
 Buenos Aires Visual Plan

References

External links

 Anex L of Law nº 24,449/95 (diagrams of road signs) on Government of Argentina site (Spanish)
 All the DNV road signs manuals on Government of Argentina site

Argentina
Transport in Argentina

pl:Znaki drogowe w Argentynie
sv:Vägmärken i Argentina